Yaddi Bolagh or Yadi Bolagh or Yeddi Bolagh, also rendered as Yadibulak and Yadibulaq, may refer to:
 Yaddi Bolagh, Ahar, East Azerbaijan Province
 Yeddi Bolagh, Meyaneh, East Azerbaijan Province
 Yaddi Bolagh, Zanjan